Uruçui-Una Ecological Station is an ecological station in the state of Piauí, Brazil.

Location

It is administered by the Chico Mendes Institute for Biodiversity Conservation.
It covers all or part of the municipalities of Bom Jesus, Santa Filomena and Baixa Grande do Ribeiro in the state of Piauí.

Environment

The area is one of large sandstone plateaus cut by the valleys of perennial or intermittent rivers.
The top of the plateaus is covered by typical cerrado vegetation, while there is gallery forest in the valleys.
Fauna is very varied, and includes species such as maned wolf (Chrysocyon brachyurus), pampas deer (Ozotoceros bezoarticus), giant anteater (Myrmecophaga tridactyla), bearded bellbird (Procnias averano), hyacinth macaw (Anodorhynchus hyacinthinus), golden parakeet (Guaruba guarouba), armadillo and peccary.

Conservation

The Ecological Station is a "strict nature reserve" under IUCN protected area category Ia.
The purpose is to conserve nature and support scientific research.
Specific objectives are to protect samples of cerrado ecosystems, springs, streams and rivers forming the Gurgueia and Parnaíba Basins.
The station is threatened since it is located of the edge of the expanding grain-growing region.

References

Sources

1981 establishments in Brazil
Ecological stations of Brazil
Protected areas of Piauí
Protected areas established in 1981
Cerrado